Henri Toivomäki (born 21 February 1991) is a Finnish footballer, who plays as a defender for KuPS. He previously played for Sarpsborg 08, FC Lahti, Atalanta, FC Hämeenlinna, AFC Ajax and Almere City FC.

Career

FC Lahti
A product of the FC Lahti youth system, Henri Toivomäki made 45 appearances for the Finnish club. On 2 December 2009, he was on trial with the French club Racing Club de Lens. On 31 January 2010 Toivomäki was loaned to Atalanta, playing in Serie A, with an option to buy at the end of the 2009–10 Serie A season. The option was never activated and Toivomäki returned to Lahti, who were struggling against relegation in Veikkausliiga.

AFC Ajax
On 3 January 2011, Toivomäki signed a -year contract with Dutch club AFC Ajax. Upon his arrival, Toivomäki stated that the influence of FC Lahti teammate Jari Litmanen was decisive in his decision to join the Amsterdam-based side. In the first instance, Toivomäki joined the selection of Jong Ajax. Sidelines for the entire 2011–12 season due to a groin injury, on 27 June 2012 it was announced that Henri would play for Almere CIty on loan from Ajax until July 2013 to find his form after recovery. Making a total of 8 league appearances in the Dutch Eerste Divisie for the side form Almere, and one appearance in the KNVB Cup, not being offered a contract extension following his loan spell however, Toivomäki was released from Ajax, returning to his native Finland.

Return to FC Lahti
On 23 July 2013 it was announced that Henri Toivomäki had signed with his former club FC Lahti, following the announcement of the club manager Juha Malinen.

Sarpsborg 08
On 24 November 2015 he signed with Sarpsborg 08.

HJK Helsinki
On 31 December 2018, Toivomäki signed with HJK Helsinki.

International career
He has represented Finland at different youth levels, currently he is part of the Finland national under-21 football team. He is considered as one of the most talented junior players in Finland. He was selected to represent Finland U21 against Liechtenstein on 7 September 2010.

Toivomäki was called up to the senior Finland national football team, and made his debut in a 2–0 friendly loss to Romania on 5 June 2018.

Career statistics

1 Includes UEFA Europa League Qualifier matches.

2 Includes Liigacup and Johan Cruijff Shield.

Honours
Individual
Veikkausliiga Team of the Year: 2022

References

External links
 
 Henri Toivomäki at Altomfotball
 

1991 births
Living people
People from Mäntsälä
Finnish footballers
Finland international footballers
Finland youth international footballers
Finnish expatriate footballers
FC Lahti players
Veikkausliiga players
Ykkönen players
Atalanta B.C. players
AFC Ajax players
Almere City FC players
Eerste Divisie players
Expatriate footballers in Italy
Expatriate footballers in the Netherlands
Finnish expatriate sportspeople in Italy
Sarpsborg 08 FF players
Helsingin Jalkapalloklubi players
Eliteserien players
Expatriate footballers in Norway
Finnish expatriate sportspeople in Norway
Kuopion Palloseura players
Association football fullbacks
Reipas Lahti players
Sportspeople from Uusimaa